Falls of Dee is a waterfall on Braeriach in the Cairngorms, Scotland.

See also
Waterfalls of Scotland

References

Waterfalls of Aberdeenshire